A secosteroid is a type of steroid with a "broken" ring. The word secosteroid derives from the Latin verb secare meaning "to cut", and 'steroid'. Secosteroids are alternatively described as a subclass of steroids or derived from steroids.

Types or subclasses of secosteroids are defined by the carbon atoms of the parent steroid skeleton where the ring cleavage has taken place. For example, 9,10-secosteroids derived from cleavage of the bond between carbon atoms C9 and C10 of the steroid B-ring (similarly 5,6-secosteroids, 13,14-steroids, etc.).

The prototypical secosteroid is cholecalciferol (vitamin D3).

Some nonsteroidal estrogens, like doisynolic acid and allenolic acid, are also secosteroids or secosteroid-like compounds.

References

External links